The Journal of Commonwealth Literature (JCL) is a quarterly peer-reviewed academic journal that covers the field of literature, especially Commonwealth and postcolonial literatures, including colonial discourse and translational studies. The journal's editors-in-chief are Claire Chambers (University of York) and Rachael Gilmour (Queen Mary University of London).

It was established in 1966 by Norman Jeffares and Arthur Ravenscroft at Heinemann. In 1970, JCL began being published by Oxford University Press. Hanz Zell became the publisher of JCL in 1979. Zell was acquired by K. G. Saur Verlag the following year. After Saur was acquired by Reed International in 1987, its British division was merged with the British holdings of sister publisher R. R. Bowker to form Bowker-Saur. Cambridge Information Group acquired Bowker-Saur in 2001. JCL has been published by SAGE Publications since 2003.

Abstracting and indexing 
The Journal of Commonwealth Literature is abstracted and indexed in:
 Academic Search Premier
 Arts and Humanities Citation Index
 Current Contents/Arts & Humanities
 Humanities Index
 Periodicals Content Index
 Scopus

References

External links 
 

SAGE Publishing academic journals
English-language journals
Literary magazines published in the United Kingdom
Quarterly journals
Publications established in 1966